30 Days of Night is the movie novelization of the film 30 Days of Night, itself based on the comic series 30 Days of Night. The comic has several novel spinoffs of its own; however, unlike those, 30 Days of Night is not written by the comic author (Steve Niles) but by English horror writer Tim Lebbon. The novelization closely follows the plot of the movie.

External links 
 
30 Days of Night on Goodreads

Notes 

2007 American novels
30 Days of Night novels
Novels based on films